Stylidium productum is a small plant found in eastern Australia. Common in the Sydney region, it grows on soils derived from Hawkesbury sandstone.

Flowers appear in spring and summer, having five pink petals, but one is very small.

Pollination 
Stylidium productum features an unusual form of pollination.

The style and two anthers strike insects landing on the flower, which are then showered with pollen.

References 

Asterales of Australia
Flora of New South Wales
productum